Mickle may refer to:

Geographical features
Mickle Fell, mountain in the Pennines, England
Mickle Island, southeast of Flagstaff Point, west of Ross Island, Antarctica
Mickle Mere, nature reserve south of Ixworth in Suffolk, England
Mickle Trafford, village in Cheshire, England

Surname
Andrew H. Mickle (1805–63), Mayor of New York from 1846 to 1847
Charles Mickle, (1849–1910), Canadian politician
Jim Mickle (born 1979), American film director and writer
Kim Mickle (born 1984), Australian javelin thrower
Robert Mickle (1925–2009), American city planner and community leader
Stephan P. Mickle (born 1944), American lawyer and judge 
William Julius Mickle (1735–1788), Scottish poet

Given name
Arthur William Mickle Ellis (1883–1966), British-Canadian physician, pathologist, Regius Professor of Medicine at the University of Oxford 1943–1948
Walter Mickle Smith (1867–1953), civil engineer who worked primarily on U.S. dams and waterway projects
Kathryn Mickle Werdegar (born 1936), former Associate Justice of the Supreme Court of California
John Mickle Whitall (1800–1877), US sea captain, businessman and philanthropist in New Jersey and Pennsylvania

See also
Mickel
Micle
Mikel
Mikell (disambiguation)
Mykle